Lectionary 58, designated by siglum ℓ 58 (in the Gregory-Aland numbering), is a Greek manuscript of the New Testament, on paper leaves. Palaeographically it has been assigned to the 16th century.

Description 

The codex contains only five lessons from the Gospel of Matthew and Gospel of Luke. It is a lectionary (Evangelistarion). 
It is written in Greek minuscule letters, on 49 paper leaves. Written in one column per page, in 10–11 lines per page.

History 

The manuscript was brought from some church in Greece. It was added to the list of New Testament manuscripts by Scholz.

It was examined and described by Paulin Martin C. R. Gregory saw it in 1884.

The manuscript is not cited in the critical editions of the Greek New Testament (UBS3).

Currently the codex is located in the Bibliothèque nationale de France, (Suppl. Gr. 50) in Paris.

See also 

 List of New Testament lectionaries
 Biblical manuscript
 Textual criticism

Notes and references 

Greek New Testament lectionaries
16th-century biblical manuscripts